The 2019 FIBA U16 European Championship Division B was the 16th edition of the Division B of the FIBA U16 European Championship. It was played in Podgorica, Montenegro, from 8 to 17 August 2019. 24 teams participated in the competition. Poland men's national under-16 basketball team won the tournament.

Poland's Jeremy Sochan got elected as tournament MVP.

Participating teams 
  (3rd place, 2018 FIBA U16 European Championship Division C)

  (16th place, 2018 FIBA U16 European Championship Division A)

  (14th place, 2018 FIBA U16 European Championship Division A)
  (15th place, 2018 FIBA U16 European Championship Division A)

First round

Group A

Group B

Group C

Group D

Playoffs

17th–24th place playoffs

9th–16th place playoffs

Championship playoffs

Final standings

References

External links
FIBA official website

FIBA U16 European Championship Division B
2019–20 in European basketball
2019–20 in Montenegrin basketball
International youth basketball competitions hosted by Montenegro
Sports competitions in Podgorica
August 2019 sports events in Europe